Regard may refer to:

 Regard (DJ), Kosovan musician
 Regards, monthly French Communist news magazine
 "Regard", 1990 song by Barre Phillips